The List of Ineos Grenadiers riders contains riders from the team which have had the names Sky Professional Cycling, Sky Procycling, Team Sky, Team Ineos and presently, .

2010 (Sky Professional Cycling)
Ages as of 1 January 2010.

2011 (Sky Procycling)
Ages as of 1 January 2011.

2012 (Sky Procycling)
Ages as of 1 January 2012.

2013 (Sky Procycling)

2014 (Team Sky)

2015 (Team Sky)

2016 (Team Sky)

2017 (Team Sky)

2018 (Team Sky)

2019 (Team Sky/Team Ineos)

2020 (Team Ineos/Ineos Grenadiers)

2021 (Ineos Grenadiers)

2022 (Ineos Grenadiers)

2023 (Ineos Grenadiers)

Footnotes

References

See also
Team Sky
List of wins by Sky Professional Racing and its successors

Riders
Lists of cyclists by team